The School of Tropical Medicine may refer to:  

 The Calcutta School of Tropical Medicine in Calcutta, India
 The Harvard School of Tropical Medicine at Harvard University
 The Liverpool School of Tropical Medicine
 The London School of Tropical Medicine, now named the London School of Hygiene & Tropical Medicine
 The School of Tropical Medicine (Puerto Rico), now part of the School of Medicine of the University of Puerto Rico
 Tulane University School of Public Health and Tropical Medicine